Chelsea International Academy, is a Higher Secondary boarding school in Nepal. The college of this institution  is  located at Lakhe Chaur Marg, Kathmandu and school is located at Attarkhel . Gokarneshwar Municipality. The School was founded in 2005 and has been focusing on Pre-Primary school, Primary School, Lower Secondary through Montessori method and Cambridge GCE A-Level at present. It currently has around 1000 students and is divided into two blocks : Junior block and Senior block.

Academics
The school operates three courses of study:
School Leaving Certificate level (a nationwide curriculum up to class 10 prescribed by the Department of Education of Nepal)
+2 Science and Management (affiliated to NEB),
 Cambridge International A-Level

Infrastructure and facilities
Key infrastructures of the school are as follows:
 Operational lab for science (physics, chemistry and biology).
 ICT Lab
 Multiple dining halls
 Library

References

Schools in Kathmandu
2005 establishments in Nepal